Heřmanský–Pudlák syndrome (often written Hermansky–Pudlak syndrome or abbreviated HPS) is an extremely rare autosomal recessive disorder which results in oculocutaneous albinism (decreased pigmentation), bleeding problems due to a platelet abnormality (platelet storage pool defect), and storage of an abnormal fat-protein compound (lysosomal accumulation of ceroid lipofuscin). It is thought to affect around 1 in 500,000 people worldwide, with a significantly higher occurrence in Puerto Ricans, with a prevalence of 1 in 1800. Many of the clinical research studies on the disease have been conducted in Puerto Rico.

There are eight classic forms of the disorder, based on the genetic mutation from which the disorder stems.

It is named for František Heřmanský (1916–1980) and Pavel Pudlák (1927–1993).

Signs and symptoms
There are three main disorders caused by Hermansky–Pudlak syndrome, which result in these symptoms:
 Albinism and eye problems: Individuals will have varying amounts of skin pigment (melanin).  Because of the albinism there are eye problems such as light sensitivity (photophobia), strabismus (crossed eyes), and nystagmus (involuntary eye movements).  Hermansky–Pudlak syndrome also impairs vision.
 Bleeding disorders: Individuals with the syndrome have platelet dysfunction. Since platelets are necessary for blood clotting, individuals will bruise and bleed easily.
 Cellular storage disorders: The syndrome causes a wax-like substance (ceroid) to accumulate in the body tissues and cause damage, especially in the lungs and kidneys.

It is also associated with granulomatous colitis,, an inflammation of the colon, and with pulmonary fibrosis, a potentially fatal lung disease.

Causes
HPS can be caused by mutations in several genes: HPS1, HPS3, HPS4, HPS5, HPS6 and HPS7.

HPS type 2, which includes immunodeficiency in its phenotype, is caused by mutation in the AP3B1 gene.

HPS type 7 may result from a mutation in the gene coding for dysbindin protein.

Hermansky–Pudlak syndrome is thought to be inherited as an autosomal recessive genetic trait. The defective gene, called HSP , responsible for this disorder is located on the long arm of chromosome 10 (10q2). Some research suggests that an abnormality of lysosomal function may be responsible for the development of the disease.

HPS1, AP3B1, HPS3, HPS4, HPS5, HPS6, DTNBP1 and  Biogenesis of Lysosome-related Organelles Complex (BLOC1, BLOC1S2 and BLOC3) are associated with Hermansky–Pudlak syndrome.

In autosomal recessive disorders, the condition does not appear unless a person inherits two copies of the defective gene responsible for the disorder, one copy coming from each parent.  If an individual receives one normal gene and one gene for the disorder, the person will be a carrier for the disease, but usually will not show symptoms.  The risk of transmitting the disease to the children of a couple, both of whom are carriers for a recessive disorder, is 25 percent.  Fifty percent of their children risk being carriers of the disease, but generally will not show symptoms of the disorder. Twenty-five percent of their children may receive both normal genes, one from each parent, and will be genetically normal (for that particular trait).  The risk is the same for each pregnancy.

Pathophysiology
The mechanism of Hermansky–Pudlak syndrome indicates that platelets in affected individuals accumulate abnormally with thrombin, epinephrine, and adenosine diphosphate, furthermore platelets in these individuals have a lower amount of dense bodies

Diagnosis
The diagnosis of HPS is established by clinical findings of hypopigmentation
of the skin and hair, characteristic eye findings, and demonstration of absent
dense bodies on whole mount electron microscopy of platelets.  Molecular
genetic testing of the HPS1 gene is available on a clinical basis for
individuals from northwestern Puerto Rico.  Molecular testing of the HPS3 gene
is available on a clinical basis for individuals of central Puerto Rican or
Ashkenazi Jewish heritage.  Sequence analysis is available on a clinical basis
for mutations in HPS1 and HPS4.  Diagnosis of individuals with other types of
HPS is available on a research basis only.

Treatment
While there is no cure for HPS, treatment for chronic hemorrhages associated with the disorder includes therapy with vitamin E and the antidiuretic dDAVP.

Considerations for patients 
A preoperative pulmonology consultation is needed. The anesthesia team should
be aware that patients may have postoperative pulmonary complications as part
of the syndrome.

Preoperative hematology consultation is advisable prior to elective ocular
surgeries. Since patients with the syndrome have bleeding tendencies,
intraoperative, perioperative, and postoperative hemorrhages should be
prevented and treated. If platelet aggregation improves with desmopressin, it
may be administered in the preoperative period. However, sometimes
plasmapheresis is needed in the perioperative period.

Ophthalmologists should try to avoid retrobulbar blocks in patients with the
syndrome. Whenever possible, patients with HPS may benefit from general
endotracheal anesthesia.  Phacoemulsification may help prevent intraoperative
and postoperative bleeding in patients with the syndrome. Prolonged bleeding
has been reported following strabismus surgery in patients with the syndrome.

Prognosis
The course of HPS has been mild in rare instances of the disorder, however, the general prognosis is still considered to be poor.The disease can cause dysfunctions of the lungs, intestine, kidneys, and heart. The major complication of most forms of the disorder is pulmonary fibrosis, which typically exhibits in patients ages 40–50 years. This is a fatal complication seen in many forms of HPS, and is the usual cause of death from the disorder. HPS patients who develop pulmonary fibrosis typically have type 1 or type 4.

Research
HPS is one of the rare lung diseases currently being studied by The Rare Lung Diseases Consortium (RLDC).  The RLDC is part of the Rare Diseases Clinical Research Network (RDCRN), an initiative of the Office of Rare Diseases Research (ORDR), of the National Center for Advancing Translational Sciences (NCATS).  The RLDC is dedicated to developing new diagnostics and therapeutics for patients with rare lung diseases, through collaboration between the NIH, patient organizations and clinical investigators.

See also
 Biogenesis of lysosome-related organelles complex 1
 List of cutaneous conditions

References

External links 
  GeneReviews/NCBI/NIH/UW entry on Hermansky-Pudlak Syndrome

Disturbances of human pigmentation
Syndromes affecting the skin
Amino acid metabolism disorders
Autosomal recessive disorders
Rare syndromes
Coagulopathies
IUIS-PID table 3 immunodeficiencies
Syndromes affecting blood
Syndromes affecting the lung